Galeocharax is a genus of characins from the Río de la Plata and Amazon basins in South America.

Species
There are currently four recognized species in this genus:

Galeocharax goeldi (Fowler, 1913)
Galeocharax gulo (Cope, 1870)
Galeocharax humeralis (Valenciennes, 1834)
Galeocharax knerii (Steindachner, 1879)

References

Characidae
Fish of South America